Euagassiceras is an extinct genus of cephalopod belonging to the Ammonite subclass.

Distribution
Jurassic of Argentina, Germany and the United Kingdom.

References

Early Jurassic ammonites of Europe
Ammonites of Europe
Arietitidae
Ammonitida genera